The Logan Township School District is a community public school district that serves students in pre-kindergarten through eighth grade from Logan Township, in Gloucester County, New Jersey, United States.

As of the 2021–22 school year, the district, comprised of three schools, had an enrollment of 876 students and 82.5 classroom teachers (on an FTE basis), for a student–teacher ratio of 10.6:1.

The district is classified by the New Jersey Department of Education as being in District Factor Group "FG", the fourth-highest of eight groupings. District Factor Groups organize districts statewide to allow comparison by common socioeconomic characteristics of the local districts. From lowest socioeconomic status to highest, the categories are A, B, CD, DE, FG, GH, I and J.

Public school students in ninth through twelfth grades are educated at Kingsway Regional High School under a sending/receiving relationship in which tuition is paid on a per-pupil basis to the Kingsway Regional School District, which serves students in seventh through twelfth grades from East Greenwich Township, South Harrison Township, Swedesboro and Woolwich Township. As of the 2021–22 school year, the district, comprised of two schools, had an enrollment of 2,863 students and 231.8 classroom teachers (on an FTE basis), for a student–teacher ratio of 12.4:1. Schools in the district (with 2021–22 enrollment data from the National Center for Education Statistics) are 
Kingsway Regional Middle School with 925 students in grades 7-8 and 
Kingsway Regional High School with 1,893 students in grades 9-12. Under a 2011 proposal, Kingsway would merge with its constituent member's K-6 districts to become a full K-12 district, with various options for including Logan Township as part of the consolidated district.

Schools
Schools in the district (with 2021–22 enrollment data from the National Center for Education Statistics) are:ref>School Performance Reports for the Logan Township School District, New Jersey Department of Education. Accessed February 2, 2023.</ref>
Francis E. Donnelly Early Childhood Learning Center with 197 students in grades PreK-K
Beverly Green, Principal
Logan Elementary School with 302 students in grades 1-4
Catherine Kelly, Principal
Logan Middle School with 372 students in grades 5-8
Will Turner, Principal

Administration
Core members of the district's administration are:
Patricia L. Haney, Superintendent
Dawn Leary, Business Administrator / Board Secretary

Board of education
The district's board of education, comprised of nine members, sets policy and oversees the fiscal and educational operation of the district through its administration. As a Type II school district, the board's trustees are elected directly by voters to serve three-year terms of office on a staggered basis, with three seats up for election each year held (since 2012) as part of the November general election. The board appoints a superintendent to oversee the district's day-to-day operations and a business administrator to supervise the business functions of the district.

References

External links
Logan Township School District

School Data for the Logan Township School Districts, National Center for Education Statistics
Kingsway Regional School District

Logan Township, New Jersey
New Jersey District Factor Group FG
School districts in Gloucester County, New Jersey